Hibbat Zion may refer to:

Hibat Tzion, a moshav in central Israel.
An alternative name for Hovevei Zion.